HMS Angler was a two-funnel, 30-knot destroyer ordered by the Royal Navy under the 1895 – 1896 Naval Estimates.  She was the second ship to carry this name. She was launched in 1897, served at Chatham and Portsmouth and was sold for breaking in 1920.

Construction
She was laid down as yard number 313 on 21 December 1896, at the John I Thornycroft and Company shipyard at Chiswick on the River Thames.  She was launched on 2 February 1897.  During her builder's trials her maximum average speed was 30.4 knots. She proceeded to Portsmouth to have her armament fitted.  She was completed and accepted by the Royal Navy in July 1898.  During her acceptance trials and work ups her average sea speed was 25 knots.

Pre-War
After commissioning she was assigned to the Chatham Division of the Harwich Flotilla, where she was part of the Medway Instructional Flotilla.  She was the flotilla leader under the command of Commander John de Robeck during exercises in 1899. Lieutenant Charles Tibbits was appointed in command in September 1899, serving as such for a year until September 1900. In October 1901 she collided in heavy wind near Felixstowe pier with the passenger steamer Suffolk, and the stem was damaged. She was quickly repaired, and left Sheerness to rejoin the instructional flotilla in early December. In early August 1902 she was again back in the Medway flotilla, taking the crew of  under the command of Lieutenant George Geoffrey Codrington. She took part in the fleet review held at Spithead on 16 August 1902 for the coronation of King Edward VII, before Codrington and the crew turned over to the HMS Hardy which replaced her in the flotilla in December the same year.

In 1903 she deployed to the Mediterranean Fleet.

On 30 August 1912 the Admiralty directed all destroyer classes were to be designated by alpha characters starting with the letter 'A'.  Since her design speed was 30-knots and she had two funnels she was assigned to the D class.  After 30 September 1913, she was known as a D-class destroyer and had the letter 'D' painted on the hull below the bridge area and on either the fore or aft funnel.

World War I
August 1914 found her in commission in the Portsmouth Local Flotilla tendered to HMS Excellent, the Portsmouth-based gunnery school.  She remained in this deployment for the duration of the First World War.

Disposition
In 1919 she was paid off and laid-up in reserve awaiting disposal. She was sold on 20 May 1920 to Thos. W. Ward of Sheffield for breaking at Milford Haven, Pembrokeshire in Wales.

Pennant numbers

References

Bibliography
 
 
 
 
 
 
 
 
 
 

 

Ships built in Chiswick
1897 ships
D-class destroyers (1913)
Ships built by John I. Thornycroft & Company